Nhị độ mai (二度梅, "The Plum Tree Blossoms Twice") is a Nôm poem of Vietnam.

Text

References

External links
 Nhị Độ Mai, Vietnamese

Vietnamese poems